The 1999 World Table Tennis Championships women's singles was the 45th edition of the women's singles championship.
Wang Nan defeated Zhang Yining in the final by three sets to two, to win the title.

Results

See also
List of World Table Tennis Championships medalists

References

-
World